Dense body may refer to:

 Dense granule, a secretory organelle
 Ribbon synapse, a type of neuronal synapse
 Electron-dense portions of smooth muscle